Amritsari Papad or papar is a variety of the papad snack  specific to the north Indian state of Punjab and the surrounding region, and even more specific to the city of Amritsar. Amritsari papad is famous throughout India, and is also exported abroad.

Like papad elsewhere in India, Amritsari papad is made from dough, usually of hulled urad daal flour, seasoned liberally with salt, black pepper, heeng (asafoetida), cumin, coriander, pomegranate seeds, and sometimes garlic. The proportions are highly variable, leading to a large variety in taste and pungency. The dough is rolled into wafer thin discs the size of a small plate, and sun-dried to prepare raw papad. Flours from other sources such as lentils, chickpeas, rice, tapioca or potato, are sometimes used. Dried papad will keep for several months without refrigeration. Although now done by machines, papad was traditionally rolled out by hand, requiring a fair amount of force because of the dryness of the dough—indeed, In Hindi and Punjabi, "papad belna" (rolling out papad) is still a metaphor for any laborious or arduous task.

Papad is prepared by roasting in an oven or on an open flame, and because it is so thin and dry, takes but a fraction of a minute to be done. In Punjab, it is typically served as an accompaniment to a meal, but elsewhere in India, it is also eaten as an appetizer or snack, with toppings such as chopped onions, carrots, chutney or other dips and condiments. Papad is a low calorie food but has a high sodium content.

References

Indian snack foods
Indian breads
Amritsar